Khodaabad (also Romanized as Khodāābād; also known as Khūdābād) is a village in Roshtkhar Rural District, in the Central District of Roshtkhar County, Razavi Khorasan Province, Iran. At the 2006 census, its population was 174, in 36 families.

References 

Populated places in Roshtkhar County